Gerald Marcus Meehan (born September 3, 1946) is a Canadian former professional ice hockey left winger and the former general manager and Senior Vice President of the Buffalo Sabres.

Playing career
Meehan was born in Toronto, Ontario and raised in Newmarket, Ontario. He played minor hockey for St. Michael's College School and junior for the Toronto Marlboros. He played for the 1966–67 Marlboros that won the Memorial Cup.

Meehan was drafted by the Toronto Maple Leafs in the 1963 NHL Amateur Draft, fourth round, 21st overall. He played for the National Hockey League's Toronto Maple Leafs, Philadelphia Flyers, Buffalo Sabres, Vancouver Canucks, Atlanta Flames, Washington Capitals, as well as the Ontario Hockey Association's Toronto Marlboros, American Hockey League's Rochester Americans, CPHL's Tulsa Oilers, Western Hockey League's Phoenix Roadrunners, Seattle Totems, and the World Hockey Association's Cincinnati Stingers. He served as captain for both the Sabres and Capitals.

One of Meehan's career highlights as a Sabre remains a lowlight to Flyers fans. In the last game of the 1971–72 regular season, the Flyers needed a win or a tie against the Sabres to beat out the Pittsburgh Penguins for the final playoff spot.

Retirement
After completing his undergraduate degree from Canisius College in Buffalo, Meehan graduated from the University at Buffalo School of Law in 1982.  He practiced sports, corporate, and immigration law with the firm Cohen, Swados, Wright, Hanifin, Bradford and Brett, including working on player contracts with Scotty Bowman, then the Sabres' coach and general manager. Meehan had joined the firm hoping to work with the Sabres.

General Manager and VP
In 1984, the team made Meehan the first former Sabre to serve in a front-office position, as assistant general manager under Bowman. During the 1986–87 season, Bowman stepped down, and Meehan was promoted to general manager.  With the departures of Bowman and superstar Gilbert Perreault, the Sabres finished the season in last place overall that year, but rebounded the next year as NHL's most improved team, with a record of 37–32–11 – and 21 points higher in the standings.

Meehan's years as a general manager were marked by the addition of a number of top-caliber players, including No. 1 draft pick Pierre Turgeon, Soviet defector Alex Mogilny, Dale Hawerchuk, Pat LaFontaine, and Dominik Hašek. In 1993, Meehan was named the executive vice president of sports operations, taking a more active role in the organization's business and legal affairs. 

In 1996, Gerry left the Sabres organization and founded GMM Consulting Services, now Cardinal Consultants Ltd., which provides a wide variety of consulting services to sports teams, leagues, associations, and athletes.

Career statistics

Regular season and playoffs

External links
 
Profile at hockeydraftcentral.com
The Gerry Meehan Archives

1946 births
Living people
Atlanta Flames players
Buffalo Sabres captains
Buffalo Sabres executives
Buffalo Sabres players
Canadian ice hockey left wingers
Canisius College alumni
Cincinnati Stingers players
Ice hockey people from Toronto
National Hockey League executives
Philadelphia Flyers players
Seattle Totems (WHL) players
Sportspeople from Newmarket, Ontario
Toronto Maple Leafs draft picks
Toronto Maple Leafs players
Toronto Marlboros players
Tulsa Oilers (1964–1984) players
Vancouver Canucks players
Washington Capitals players